Gbeya (Gbɛ́yá, Gbaya-Bossangoa) is a Gbaya language of the Central African Republic. Ethnologue reports it may be mutually intelligible with Bozom.

Suma (Súmā) is a language variety closely related to Gbeya.

Phonology

Consonants

Vowels

References

External links
Suma materials from Raymond Boyd

Gbaya languages
Languages of the Central African Republic